Lê Quang Duy (born February 5, 1998), better known as SofM (short for Style of Me), is a Vietnamese professional League of Legends player for Weibo Gaming.

SofM is widely known in the Vietnamese League of Legends community for his skills, tactics, and unique playstyle. He is regarded as one of Vietnam's best esports players in League of Legends. He had played at Jungler role for Suning and reached to the 2020 League of Legends World Championship finals, but lost to DAMWON Gaming.

Notes

References

External links 

 Game statistics of SofM

Living people
Vietnamese esports players
Sportspeople from Hanoi
1998 births
League of Legends jungle players